Cladosporium dominicanum is a fungus found in hypersaline environments. It has globoid conidia. It has also been found in plant material.

References

Cladosporium
Fungi described in 2007